

Johann Mohr (12 June 1916 – 2 April 1943) was a captain with the Kriegsmarine during World War II. He was a recipient of the Knight's Cross of the Iron Cross with Oak Leaves of Nazi Germany.

Mohr joined the Reichsmarine in 1934.

On 25/26 September 1941 Mohr was part of a Wolfpack that attacked convoy HG 73. Mohr sank Empire Stream, Petrel and Siremalm. Rolf Mützelburg sank the steamer Cortes, for which Mohr has been wrongly credited.

On 24 November and 3 December 1941 Mohr sank the British light cruiser  and the steamer Sagadahoc. On 14 March 1942 British Resource was sunk by Mohr and his crew. In March Mohr achieved a run of successes; Ceiba and Acme (17 March), Kassandra Louloudis and E.M. Clark (18 March), Papoose and W.E. Hutton (19 March), Esso Nashville and Atlantic Sun (21 March) and finally Naeco on 23 March completed the run. All but three were United States-owned vessels.

He sank four ships from Convoy ON 92 in May 1942; SS Empire Dell, Mount Parnes, Cristales and Llanover. On 9 June the Free French corvette Mimosa was engaged and sunk by U-124, the  escort screen prevented Mohr from sinking any ships from Convoy ONS 100. Mohr persisted, and three nights later, on 12 June, he sank the 4,093grt British steamer Dartford. Six days later, Mohr picked up Convoy ONS 102 in the congested Atlantic shipping lanes. He accounted for the American  cargo Seattle Spirit, which destroyed 5,627grt. Mohr's last success of the year came on 28 December, when U-124 torpedoed and sank the British ship Treworlas (4,692grt).

On 9 January 1943 Mohr intercepted the United States Navy Convoy TB-1. In a single action Mohr and his crew sank Broad Arrow (7,718grt), Birmingham City	(6,194grt), Collingsworth (5,101grt) and the 4,554grt Minotaur; amounting to approximately 24,000 grts.

On 2 April 1943 Mohr sailed U-124 to intercept Convoy OS 45. He succeeded in penetrating the escort screen and sinking Gogra (5,190 grt) and Katha (4,357grt) in position . The escorts were alerted and began hunting the U-boat.

Awards
 Spanish Cross in Bronze (6 June 1939)
 Memel Medal (26 October 1939)
 Iron Cross (1939) 2nd Class (29 November 1939) & 1st Class (4 May 1941)
 U-boat War Badge (1939) (4 May 1941)
 Knight's Cross of the Iron Cross with Oak Leaves
 Knight's Cross on 27 March 1942 as Kapitänleutnant and commander of U-124
 177th Oak Leaves on 13 January 1943 as Kapitänleutnant and commander of U-124

References

Notes

Bibliography

 
 
 Rohwer, Jürgen (1999). Axis submarine successes of World War Two: German, Italian, and Japanese submarine successes, 1939–1945. Greenhill Books. .

1916 births
1943 deaths
Military personnel from Hanover
Kriegsmarine personnel killed in World War II
U-boat commanders (Kriegsmarine)
German military personnel of the Spanish Civil War
Recipients of the Knight's Cross of the Iron Cross with Oak Leaves
Reichsmarine personnel
People lost at sea
People from the Province of Hanover
Captains who went down with the ship